The 149th Indiana Infantry Regiment was an infantry regiment from Indiana that served in the Union Army between March 1 and September 27, 1865, during the American Civil War.

Service 
The regiment was recruited from the 7th district, and was organized at Indianapolis, Indiana, with a strength of 1,041 men and mustered in on March 1, 1865. It left Indiana for Nashville, Tennessee on March 3. It was then ordered to Decatur, Alabama for guard and garrison duty until late September. Whilst at Decatur, the regiment received the surrender of Generals Roddey and Polk. The regiment was mustered out at Nashville, on September 27, 1865. During its service the regiment incurred thirty-eight fatalities, and another twenty-seven men deserted.

See also
 List of Indiana Civil War regiments

Notes

References

Bibliography 
 Dyer, Frederick H. (1959). A Compendium of the War of the Rebellion. New York and London. Thomas Yoseloff, Publisher. .
 Holloway, William R. (2004). Civil War Regiments From Indiana. eBookOnDisk.com Pensacola, Florida. .
 Terrell, W.H.H. (1867). The Report of the Adjutant General of the State of Indiana. Containing Rosters for the Years 1861–1865, Volume 7. Indianapolis, Indiana. Samuel M. Douglass, State Printer.

External links
 George Washington Harris Civil War Diary, The University of Alabama in Huntsville Archives and Special Collections Diary of George Washington Harris,  a 1st Sergeant in the 149th Indiana Infantry Regiment, Company F.

Units and formations of the Union Army from Indiana
1865 establishments in Indiana
Military units and formations established in 1865
Military units and formations disestablished in 1865